The Marble Game Getter is a light, double-barrel (over-under), combination gun manufactured by the Marble's Arms & Manufacturing Company in Gladstone, Michigan.   The firearm features a skeleton folding stock and a rifle barrel over a smooth-bore shotgun barrel.  A manually pivoted hammer striker is used to select the upper or lower barrel. Three generations of the system were/are produced—First Generation (Model 1908), Second Generation (Model 1921) and the Third Generation currently manufactured by Marble Arms.

Variants

The First Generation (Model 1908)
The Model 1908 was generally produced in a .22 Short/.22 LR over .44 Shotshell configuration, though other rifle calibers were produced (e.g., .25-20, .32-20, .38-40).  A barrel length of 15" was common, though some 18" and 12" models were produced.  The Model 1908 was produced between 1908 and 1918.

Two variations of the Model 1908 were made, the 1908A and 1908B.  The former featured a flexible rear tang sight mounted behind the hammer and the latter had the sight hole plugged.

The Second Generation (Model 1921)
Production of the Model 1921 started in 1921 and was essentially a new design.  The grip, folding stock, safety, and several other features were redesigned.  The Model 1921 was generally produced in either a .22 LR over .44 Shotshell or .22 LR over .410-bore shotgun configuration.  The .410 model featured 2 or 2½" chambers, with the former being much more common.  Barrel lengths of 12", 15" and 18" were produced.  After the passage of the 1934 National Firearms Act, the 12 and 15" models were discontinued for domestic sales.  The shorter barrel versions were offered in Canada until 1955.  The last Model 1921 was produced from spare parts in 1962.

The Third Generation
A third production model is currently produced by Marble Arms.  It is similar in appearance to the Model 1908 and features a .22 LR rifle barrel over a .410-bore shotgun barrel.  The only barrel length offered is 18½".

Regulation
In the United States, models featuring shotgun barrel lengths of less than 18" require a $5 transfer tax stamp and registration as an Any Other Weapon to be in compliance with the National Firearms Act (NFA).  Original Model 1908 and Model 1921 models produced before 1943 are Curios & Relics under US law, but are still subject to the provisions of the NFA if their barrels are less than 18" in length; the 18" barrel variation was administratively removed from the NFA in 1939 by the Bureau of Internal Revenue after determining that it was not concealable on the person. In Canada, the Game Getter is classified as "restricted" or prohibited depending on the calibre under current laws.

"Any Other Weapon," as defined in 26 U.S.C., § 5845(e), means any weapon or device capable of being concealed on the person from which a shot can be discharged through the energy of an explosive, a pistol or revolver having a barrel with a smooth bore designed or redesigned to fire a fixed shotgun shell, weapons with combination shotgun and rifle barrels 12 inches or more, less than 18 inches in length, from which only a single discharge can be made from either barrel without manual reloading, and shall include any such weapon which may be readily restored to fire. Such term shall not include a pistol or revolver having a rifled bore, or rifled bores, or weapons designed, made, or intended to be fired from the shoulder and not capable of firing fixed ammunition.

References

External links

 Marble Arms® Game Getter Gun
 The All-Time Classic Pack Gun: Marble's Game-Getter
 Marble Game Getter pictures

Combination guns
.22 LR firearms
Survival guns